Beet is a plant, the taproot portion of which is eaten as a vegetable, called beets or beetroot.

Beet may also refer to:

People
 George Beet (disambiguation), the name of two English cricketers
 Gordon Beet (1939-1994), English cricketer
 Harry Churchill Beet (1873-1946), English recipient of the Victoria Cross
 Peter Beet (1937-2005), British doctor
 Beet Algar (1894-1989), New Zealand rugby player

Other uses
 Beet (album), by Eleventh Dream Day, 1989
 Beet the Vandel Buster, a manga series
 4026 Beet, an asteroid 
 Beet River, in Indonesia

See also

 Beets (disambiguation)
 Beat (disambiguation)
 Beate, a given name
 Chard, or silver beet, or leaf beet
 Mangelwurzel, or field beet
 Sea beet
 Sugar beet